The Champlain Thrust is a 200-mile long fault extending from southern Quebec, down through western Vermont in the Champlain Valley, and into eastern New York in the Catskills/Hudson Valley. The Middle Ordovician accretion of the one or more island arcs terranes drove the initial thrusting during the Taconic Orogeny, though reactivation of the fault may have occurred during the middle Devonian Acadian Orogeny. The Champlain Thrust marks the most westerly thrust of the Taconic Orogeny.

Prominent exposures 
The thrust fault is exposed to the north of the city of Burlington, Vermont on the shores of Lake Champlain at Lone Rock Point. Here the Lower Cambrian Dunham Dolomite can be seen thrust on top of the Middle Ordovician Iberville shales.

References

External links
 Vermont State Geologic Survey Website
 Photos of the thrust from Lone Rock Point, Burlington Vermont

Geology of Vermont
Structural geology